Khai Hithar is a town and Union Council of Kasur District in the Punjab province of Pakistan. It is part of Kasur Tehsil, and is located at 30°58'0N 74°13'0E with an altitude of 178 metres (587 feet).

References

Kasur District
Union councils of Kasur District